Antonio Negrini (28 January 1903 – 25 September 1994) was an Italian cyclist. He competed in two events at the 1924 Summer Olympics.

References

External links
 

1903 births
1994 deaths
Italian male cyclists
Olympic cyclists of Italy
Cyclists at the 1924 Summer Olympics
Cyclists from Piedmont
People from Molare
Sportspeople from the Province of Alessandria